Thomas Banks (born August 20, 1948) is a former American football center who played ten seasons in the National Football League (NFL).

Banks played college football for the Auburn Tigers, and was then selected by the St. Louis Cardinals in the 1970 NFL Draft. He played for the Cardinals from 1971 through 1980, sitting out the 1970 season due to a knee injury.
Banks was a four-time Pro Bowl selection, and played a total of 116 NFL games, missing all but one game of the 1974 season after sustaining a knee injury in the season opener that required surgery. Banks later played with the Birmingham Stallions of the United States Football League in 1983 and 1984.

In 1999, Banks was named to the 50th Anniversary Senior Bowl All-Time Team, having played in the 1970 edition of the game. In 2000, he was inducted to the Alabama Sports Hall of Fame.

References

1948 births
Living people
American football centers
Auburn Tigers football players
Birmingham Stallions players
St. Louis Cardinals (football) players
National Conference Pro Bowl players
Players of American football from Birmingham, Alabama